The Brevard County Manatees were a minor league baseball team of the Class A-Advanced Florida State League from 1994 to 2016. They were based in Viera, Florida, and played their home games at Space Coast Stadium. The team left Brevard County after the 2016 season for Kissimmee, Florida, where they began play in 2017 as the Florida Fire Frogs.

The team′s mascot was a manatee. From 1994 to 2001, he was named Hugh Manatee (a pun on "humanity"), and from 2002 to 2016 he was known as Manny Manatee.

Team history
In 1994, the Manatees won the East Division title, but lost the Florida State League championship series to the Tampa Yankees in four games. They won the East Division again in 2001, but due to the September 11, 2001, terrorist attacks the league championship series was canceled and the Manatees and the West Division champion, the Tampa Yankees, were declared co-champions. In 2007, the Manatees won the North Division title but lost in the league championship series to the Clearwater Threshers in four games.

On August 12, 2009, the Manatees recorded the 1,000th win in franchise history with an 8–2 win over the Dunedin Blue Jays.

The Manatees were affiliated with the Florida Marlins from 1994 to 2001 and with the Montreal Expos from 2002 through 2004. From 2005 through 2016, they were an affiliate of the Milwaukee Brewers.

The Manatees played their last game on September 4, 2016, losing to the Daytona Tortugas 6–4 before a crowd of 1,573 at Space Coast Stadium. After the 2016 season, the team relocated to Kissimmee, Florida, to play its home games at Osceola County Stadium. The name of the team changed to the Florida Fire Frogs and its affiliation switched from the Brewers to the Atlanta Braves.

Notable promotions
In April 2007, on "World Record First Pitch Attempt Day" the stadium was opened at 6:00 a.m. for the 7:00 p.m. game to allow each fan to throw a ceremonial first pitch. They were still short of the world record by several hundred pitches.

Notable alumni

Baseball Hall of Fame alumni

 Andre Dawson (1995) 2010 Inductee
 Tim Raines (2004 as manager) 2017 Inductee

Notable alumni
Orlando Arcia
John Axford
Josh Beckett
Ryan Braun
Hiram Burgos
Josh Butler
Lorenzo Cain
Chad Cordero
Tyler Cravy
Khris Davis
Ryan Dempster
Alcides Escobar
Yovani Gallardo
Mat Gamel
Scooter Gennett
David Goforth
Tom Gorzelanny
Jim Henderson
Félix Heredia
Shawn Hill
Jeremy Jeffress
Taylor Jungmann
Jonathan Lucroy
Jorge Lopez
Damien Magnifico
Matt Mantei
Mike McClendon
Brian Meadows
Randy Messenger
Kevin Millar
Jimmy Nelson
Manny Parra
Scott Podsednik
Jay Powell
Darrell Rasner
Mike Redmond
Michael Reed
Édgar Rentería
Yadiel Rivera
Nate Robertson
Tony Saunders
Logan Schafer
Grady Sizemore
Brent Suter
Joe Thatcher
Luis Ugueto
Carlos Villanueva
Tyler Wagner
Kelley Washington
Randy Winn
Chris Young

Season-by-season results

References

External links

 Brevard County Manatees official website
 Brevard County Manatees statistics at The Baseball Cube

Baseball teams established in 1994
Baseball teams disestablished in 2016
Defunct Florida State League teams
Sports in Brevard County, Florida
Professional baseball teams in Florida
Milwaukee Brewers minor league affiliates
1994 establishments in Florida
2016 disestablishments in Florida